The Belarusian minority in Lithuania (biełarusy, byelorusy, Lithuanian: baltarusiai or gudai) numbered 36,200 persons at the 2011 census, and at 1.2% of the total population of Lithuania, being the third most populous national minority. The Belarusian national minority in Lithuania has deep historical, cultural and political relations. Many famous Belarusians lived and created in Lithuania, mostly its capital Vilnius; it was in Vilnius that the first standardized Belarusian language grammar was printed.

According to the 2011 census, only 18.4% of Belarusians speak Belarusian as their mother tongue, while Russian is native for 56.3%, Polish - 9.3%, Lithuanian - 5.2% of Belarusians.

The most widespread Christian denominations among Belarusians in Lithuania are Roman Catholicism (49.6%) and Orthodoxy (32.3%).

Francysk Skaryna gymnasium is the only Belarusian school in Vilnius. One Catholic church in Vilnius (St. Bartholomew’s Church) provides religious services in Belarusian.

Some famous Lithuanian Belarusians
Francišak Ałachnovič
Kłaŭdziy Duž-Dušeŭski
Konstantinas Gałkauskas
Hryhoriy Kurec
Vacłaŭ Łastoŭski
Anton Łuckievič
Ivan Łuckievič
Łeonidas Muraška
Piotra Sierhijevič
Władysław Syrokomla
Kazimier Svajak
Branisłaŭ Taraškievič
Zośka Vieras

See also
 Ethnic minorities in Lithuania
 Belarus-Lithuania relations

References

External links

Ethnic groups in Lithuania
Lithuania